Astrodoras is a monotypic genus with the only species Astrodoras asterifrons of catfish (order Siluriformes) family Doradidae. This species originates from the Amazon basin of Bolivia and Brazil and reaches a length of about  SL. This genus is the type genus of the subfamily Astrodoradinae.

References

Doradidae
Monotypic fish genera
Fish of Bolivia
Fish of Brazil
Fish of the Amazon basin
Taxa named by Pieter Bleeker
Taxa named by Rudolf Kner